War is a large-scale armed conflict and the term is used as a metaphor for non-military conflicts.

War or WAR may also refer to:

Places
 War, West Virginia
 War Creek, a stream in West Virginia
 Warwickshire county in England, standard code

Music

Performers
 War (band), an American 1970s funk band

Albums
 War (Bolt Thrower album), 2010
 War (Born from Pain album), 2006
 War (Demon Hunter album), 2019
 War (U2 album), 1983
 War (War album), by the American band
 W.A.R. (We Are Renegades), by American hip hop artist Pharoahe Monch

Songs
 "War" (Bob Marley song), 1976
 "War" (Bone Thugs-n-Harmony song), 1998
 "War" (Drake song), 2019
 "War" (Henry Cow song), 1975
 "War" (King Von song), 2022
 "War" (Pop Smoke song), featuring Lil Tjay, 2019
 "War" (The Temptations song), 1970, also covered by Edwin Starr
 "War?", by System of a Down from  System of a Down
 "War", by ArrDee and Aitch, 2022
 "War", by Bathory from Bathory
 "War", by Burzum from Burzum
 "War", by Devin Townsend from Infinity
 "WAR!", by DragonForce from Reaching into Infinity
 "War", by Good Charlotte from Youth Authority
 "War", by Idles from Ultra Mono
 "War", by James Horner from Avatar: Music from the Motion Picture
 "War", by Jay Sean from All or Nothing
 "War", by Joe Satriani from The Extremist
 "War", by Judas Priest from Nostradamus
 "War", by Linkin Park from The Hunting Party
 "War", by Meshuggah from Rare Trax
 "War", by OutKast from Speakerboxxx/The Love Below
 "War", by Persuader from The Fiction Maze
 "War", by Poets of the Fall from Twilight Theater
 "War", by Sean Kingston from Tomorrow
 "War", by Shadows Fall from Retribution (uses same lyrics as Bob Marley's song "War")
 "War", by Wumpscut from Embryodead
 "War!", by Zach Callison from A Picture Perfect Hollywood Heartbreak
 "The War Song", by Culture Club
 "Street Fighter (War)", by Sick Puppies from Tri-Polar; used in commercials for the game Street Fighter IV

Computing
 Write after read, a data dependency hazard
 WAR (file format) (Web application ARchive), a file format used to package Java applications
 early versions of Decwar, a pioneering multi-user computer game
 War dialing, the act of detecting online, modem-accessible systems by having a computer dial a set of numbers
 Wardriving, the act of detecting wireless networking systems detecting by driving around with a Wi-Fi-equipped device
 Warchalking, notices drawn to alert people to the presence of Wi-Fi networks

Organizations
 White Aryan Resistance, an Indiana neo-Nazi white supremacist organization
 Wyatt Archaeological Research, an organization founded by amateur archaeologist Ron Wyatt
 Voina (meaning "War" in Russian), a Moscow-based performance artist collective
 Women Against Registry, a sex offender law reform organization

Wrestling
 WAR (wrestling promotion), a Japanese professional wrestling promotion known as Wrestle Association R
 Wrestling Academy Rorbas, a Swiss professional wrestling promotion
 W.A.R. Wrestling, an American independent wrestling promotion

Comics
 War comics, the genre of comics
 War (TMNT), a Teenage Mutant Ninja Turtles character
 War (Marvel Comics), about the Marvel Comics characters
 The War (comics), a 1989 Marvel Comics limited series set in that company's New Universe

Games
 War (card game), a two player card game typically using Anglo-American playing card deck
 a Brazilian variation of the board game Risk
 WARS Trading Card Game by Decipher
 Wars (series), a Nintendo video game series
 Warhammer Online: Age of Reckoning, a 2008 MMO video game
 W.A.R., a 1986 video game

Film and television 
 War film, a genre of film of which the central plot focuses on a large-scale armed conflict
 War (miniseries), a 1983 Canadian television miniseries
 War (2002 film), a 2002 Russian film about the Second Chechen War
 "War" (Da Ali G Show), a 2003 episode
 War (2007 film), a 2007 Jet Li and Jason Statham film
 War, Inc., a 2008 American political satire film
 War (2014 film), a 2014 Swiss film
War (2019 film), an Indian action thriller film directed by Siddharth Anand

Others
War (painting), painting by Paula Rego
 War language (also spelled Waar), spoken in the Indian subcontinent
 War (also known as Wars), legendary character from the myth of founding of the city of Warsaw
 ISO 639-2 and ISO 639-3 code for the Waray language in the Philippines
 One of the Four Horsemen of the Apocalypse
 War (Junger book), a 2010 book by Sebastian Junger about Afghanistan
 War (novel), a 1996 novel by Simon Hawke
 War, Literature & the Arts, an American military literary magazine
 Wins Above Replacement, a sabermetric baseball statistic
 W.A.R., the Winchester Automatic Rifle, see Winchester model 30
 Rivalry and competition between companies offering a certain service or product, such as:
 console wars
 browser wars
 editor war

See also 

 
 
 
 The War (disambiguation)

 Civil War (disambiguation)
 Cold War (disambiguation)
 Great War (disambiguation)
 World War (disambiguation)